This is a list of elections to Wrexham County Borough Council, a principal council in North Wales, established in 1996:

 1995 Wrexham County Borough Council election
 1999 Wrexham County Borough Council election
 2004 Wrexham County Borough Council election
 2008 Wrexham County Borough Council election
 2012 Wrexham County Borough Council election
 2017 Wrexham County Borough Council election
 2022 Wrexham County Borough Council election
 2027 Wrexham County Borough Council election

See also 

 Elections in Wales
 2022 Welsh local elections
 Wrexham County Borough
 List of electoral wards in Wrexham County Borough